Council elections were held on 4 December 2021 in Sydney to elect the Sydney City Council. The elections coincided with the 2021 New South Wales local elections.

Clover Moore was re-elected Lord Mayor of Sydney.

Results

Mayoral election

Council election

References

Sydney City Council elections
Sydney